Saiful Islam or Saif al-Islam ("Sword of Islam"), may refer to:

People
 Khalid ibn al-Walid, general and companion to the Islamic prophet Muhammad
Tughtakin ibn Ayyub, second Ayyubid emir of Yemen and Arabia between 1182 and 1197
 Abuhena Saifulislam (born 1963), the first Muslim appointed as an imam chaplain in the US armed forces
 Saif al-Islam Gaddafi (born 1972), son of former Libyan leader Muammar Gaddafi
 Saiful Islam (cricketer, born 1969), Bangladeshi cricketer
 Saiful Islam (chemist), Bangladeshi academic
 Saiful Islam (professor), British chemist
 Saiful Islam (footballer), Bangladeshi footballer
 Saif al-Islam el-Masry, Egyptian member of al-Qaeda

Other
 Islam, a 1987 British documentary film
 Sword of Islam (Mussolini), a ceremonial weapon given in 1937 to Benito Mussolini

See also
 Sayf al-Din (disambiguation)

Arabic masculine given names